Western Escort Force W-6 was a unit of ships of the Royal Canadian Navy serving in the Western Escort Force during the Second World War. W-6 provided protection for convoys on the east coast of Canada and into the Atlantic Ocean.

In December 1944 the group consisted of two s (and ) and two s (and )
By May 1945 Oakville had been replaced by the Flower-class corvette .

On 10 May 1945, after the official end of the German war, the German Type IX submarine   surrendered to W-6 south of Newfoundland.

Escort Groups of the Royal Navy in World War II
North American Coastal convoys of World War II
North Atlantic convoys of World War II
American Theater of World War II
Battle of the Atlantic
Royal Canadian Navy
Military units and formations of Canada in World War II
Naval battles and operations of World War II involving the United Kingdom